Weston Hills is a hamlet in the civil parish of Weston in the South Holland district of Lincolnshire, England.

On 2 October 1942, an American Boeing B-17F bomber crashed at Weston Hills.

A McDonnell Douglas F-15 Eagle fighter jet crashed in a field next to Weston Hills on 8 October 2014. The pilot ejected and survived the crash; no injuries were reported.

The local school is Weston Hills C of E Primary School.

References

External links 

Weston Hills C of E Primary School

Hamlets in Lincolnshire
South Holland, Lincolnshire